The Code of the Scarlet is a 1928 American silent western film directed by Harry Joe Brown and starring Ken Maynard, Gladys McConnell and Ed Brady. The title is also sometimes written as just Code of the Scarlet. A northern, it was distributed by First National Pictures.

Synopsis
Mountie Bruce Kenton is on the trial of a fugitive, who unknown to him is the brother of the woman he loves.

Cast
 Ken Maynard as 	Bruce Kenton
 Gladys McConnell as 	Helen Morgan
 Ed Brady as Paddy Halloran
 J.P. McGowan as Blake
 Dot Farley as Widow Malone
 Sheldon Lewis as Bartender
 Hal Salter as Comic
 Joe Rickson as Pete
 Robert Walker as 	Frank Morgan
 Joseph W. Girard as 	RCMP Inspector
 Nelson McDowell as Fur Trapper
 Lafe McKee as Fur Trapper
 Slim Whitaker as 	Henchman

References

Bibliography
 Munden, Kenneth White. The American Film Institute Catalog of Motion Pictures Produced in the United States, Part 1. University of California Press, 1997.

External links
 

1920s American films
1928 films
1928 Western (genre) films
1920s English-language films
American silent feature films
Silent American Western (genre) films
American black-and-white films
Films directed by Harry Joe Brown
First National Pictures films
Films set in Canada